The 2013 Ball State Cardinals football team represented Ball State University in the 2013 NCAA Division I FBS football season. They were led by third-year head coach Pete Lembo and played their home games at Scheumann Stadium. They were a member of the West Division of the Mid-American Conference. They finished the season 10–3, 7–1 in MAC play to finish in second place in the West Division. They were invited to the GoDaddy Bowl where they lost to Arkansas State.

Broadcasts
All Ball State games will be carried by the Ball State Radio Network on WLBC 104.1 FM.

Schedule

Game Summaries

Illinois State

Sources:

Army

Sources:

North Texas

Sources:

Eastern Michigan

Sources:

Toledo

Sources:

Virginia

Sources:

Kent State

Sources:

Western Michigan

Sources:

Akron

Sources:

Central Michigan

Sources:

Northern Illinois

Sources:

Miami (OH)

Sources:

Arkansas State-GoDaddy Bowl

Sources:

References

Ball State
Ball State Cardinals football seasons
Ball State Cardinals football